The 1934 All-Southwest Conference football team consists of American football players chosen by various organizations for All-Southwest Conference teams for the 1934 college football season.  The selectors for the 1934 season included the Associated Press (AP). The AP picked its team based on a consensus vote of 20 Texas sports writers.

The 1934 Rice Owls football team won the conference championship with a 9–1–1 record and placed four players on the first team.

All Southwest selections

Backs
 John McCauley, Rice (AP-1 [QB])
 Bohn Hilliard, Texas (AP-1 [HB])
 Bill Wallace, Rice (AP-1 [HB])
 Harry Shuford, SMU (AP-1 [FB])

Ends
 John Sylvester, Rice (AP-1)
 Phil Sanger, Texas (AP-1)

Tackles
 W. R. Benton, Arkansas (AP-1)
 Ralph Miller, Rice (AP-1)

Guards
 Billy Spivey, Arkansas (AP-1)
 J. C. Wetsel, SMU (AP-1)

Centers
 Darrell Lester, TCU (AP-1)

Key
AP = Associated Press

See also
 1934 College Football All-America Team

References

All-Southwest Conference
All-Southwest Conference football teams